James Grover Yewers (1 November 1917 – 19 September 1984) was an Australian rules footballer who played with St Kilda in the Victorian Football League (VFL).

Notes

External links 

1917 births
1984 deaths
Australian rules footballers from Melbourne
St Kilda Football Club players
University Blacks Football Club players
People from Footscray, Victoria